Carlos Hermosillo Arteaga (2 May 1977 – 20 March 2017) was a Mexican politician from the Institutional Revolutionary Party (PRI) and federal deputy in the LXIII Legislature of the Mexican Congress, representing the state of Chihuahua. He was described as the "right-hand man" of Chihuahua governor César Duarte during his time in office.

Life
Hermosillo Arteaga was born in Hidalgo del Parral and obtained his degree in business administration from the Instituto Tecnológico de Parral in 2001.

In 2011, Hermosillo was named director of the State Trust Fund for the Promotion of Productive Activities in Chihuahua (Fideapech), which provides funds to small businesses in the state. After a year at Fideapech, he became the Director General of Administration in the state's finance secretariat. From 2013 to 2015, Hermosillo served as the president of the Central Board of Water and Sanitation of the State of Chihuahua.

During his time in the state administration, Hermosillo acquired several properties, including a home worth 2.8 million pesos in the wealthy Misión del Bosque neighborhood of Chihuahua, as well as three other transactions in the span of two months. Some of the homes were registered in the name of his wife, Mayra Julieta Urbina Arzola. In December 2016, he appeared before a judge in a legal case against him for unlawful enrichment; the judge ordered the case reopened after the Duarte government closed it in its final week. By this time, he and his wife had six properties in their name in Chihuahua, worth a combined 14 million pesos.

Election as federal deputy
In 2015, Hermosillo Arteaga received the PRI nomination for federal deputy to run in Chihuahua's ninth federal electoral district, including Parral. He won the election and served on three commissions: Cooperative Development and Social Economy, Communications, and Ranching.

Death
Hermosillo Arteaga died on 20 March 2017 in a car accident on the highway between Parral and Chihuahua. A trailer blew a tire and collided against the pickup truck he was driving, causing him to lose control and be flung out the windshield. A piece of the rim of the blown tire became lodged in his body. Though he was able to pull the truck off the road and avoid further problems, he died hours later at the general hospital of Parral.  At the time of his death, he had four children between the ages of 8 and 14.

References

1977 births
2017 deaths
Politicians from Chihuahua (state)
Members of the Chamber of Deputies (Mexico) for Chihuahua (state)
Institutional Revolutionary Party politicians
21st-century Mexican politicians
Road incident deaths in Mexico
People from Parral, Chihuahua
Deputies of the LXIII Legislature of Mexico